Brian Turner may refer to:

 Brian Turner (American poet) (born 1967), American poet, essayist, and professor
 Brian Turner (New Zealand poet) (born 1944), New Zealand poet and field hockey player
 Brian Turner (drummer), drummer for the Seattle-based band Schoolyard Heroes
 Brian Turner (chef) (born 1946), British celebrity chef
 Brian Turner (footballer, born 1930), Australian footballer for Richmond
 Brian Turner (footballer, born 1933), Australian footballer for Collingwood and North Melbourne
 Brian Turner (footballer, born 1936), English football (soccer) player
 Brian Turner (footballer, born 1949), New Zealand international football (soccer) player
 Brian Turner (soccer, born 1952) (1952–2010), Australian football (soccer) player
 Brian Turner (cricketer) (1938–2015), played cricket for Yorkshire CCC
 B. Kevin Turner (born 1964/65), American businessman at Wal-Mart and Microsoft
 Brian Turner (politician), Member of the North Carolina House of Representatives

See also
 Bryan Turner (disambiguation)